Blackpool is a seaside resort in Lancashire, England. Located on the northwest coast of England, it is the main settlement within the borough also called Blackpool. At the 2011 census, the unitary authority of Blackpool had an estimated population of 139,720 while the urban settlement had a population of 147,663, making it the most populous settlement in Lancashire, and the fifth-most populous in North West England after Manchester, Liverpool, Bolton and Warrington. The wider built-up area (which also includes additional settlements outside the unitary authority) had a population of 239,409, making it the fifth-most populous urban area in the North West after the Manchester, Liverpool, Preston and Birkenhead areas. It is home to the Blackpool Tower, which when built in 1894 was the tallest building in the British Empire.

Throughout the Medieval and Early Modern period, Blackpool was a coastal hamlet in Lancashire's Amounderness Hundred and remained as such until the mid-18th century, when it became fashionable in England to travel to the coast in the summer to improve well-being. In 1781, visitors attracted to Blackpool's  sandy beach were able to use a new private road, built by Thomas Clifton and Sir Henry Hoghton. Stagecoaches began running to Blackpool from Manchester in the same year, and from Halifax in 1782. In the early 19th century, Henry Banks and his son-in-law John Cocker erected new buildings in Blackpool, which increased its population from less than 500 in 1801 to over 2,500 in 1851. St John's Church in Blackpool was consecrated in 1821.

Blackpool rose to prominence as a major centre of tourism in England when a railway was built in the 1840s connecting it to the industrialised regions of northern England. The railway made it much easier and cheaper for visitors to reach Blackpool, triggering an influx of settlers; in 1876, Blackpool was incorporated as a borough, governed by its own town council and aldermen. In 1881, Blackpool was a booming resort with a population of 14,000 and a promenade complete with piers, fortune-tellers, public houses, trams, donkey rides, fish and chip shops, and theatres. By 1901, the population of Blackpool was 47,000, by which time its place was cemented as "the archetypal British seaside resort". By 1951, it had grown to 147,000 people.

Shifts in tastes, combined with opportunities for British people to travel overseas, affected Blackpool's status as a leading resort in the late 20th century. Its urban fabric and economy both remain relatively undiversified and firmly rooted in the tourism sector, and the borough's seafront continues to attract millions of visitors every year. Blackpool's major attractions and landmarks include Blackpool Tower, Blackpool Illuminations, Pleasure Beach, Blackpool Zoo, Sandcastle Water Park, the Winter Gardens and Blackpool Tramway (the UK's only surviving first-generation tramway).

History

Toponymy
Blackpool gets its name from a historic drainage channel (possibly Spen Dyke) that ran over a peat bog, discharging discoloured water into the Irish Sea, which formed a black pool (on the other side of the sea, "Dublin" (Dubh Linn) is derived from the Irish for "black pool"). Another explanation is that the local dialect for stream was "pul" or "poole", hence "Black poole".

People originating from Blackpool are called Sandgrownians or Sandgrown'uns it is also sometimes used (as too for persons originating from Morecambe and Southport) or Seasiders (although this is more commonly associated with Blackpool F.C.).

Early history

A 13,500-year-old elk skeleton was found with man-made barbed bone points (probably from spears) on Blackpool Old Road in Carleton in 1970. Now displayed in the Harris Museum this provided the first evidence of humans living on the Fylde as far back as the Palaeolithic era. The Fylde was also home to a British tribe, the Setantii (the "dwellers in the water") a sub-tribe of the Brigantes, who from about AD80 were controlled by Romans from their fort at Dowbridge, Kirkham. During the Roman occupation the area was covered by oak forests and bog land.

Some of the earliest villages on the Fylde, which were later to become part of Blackpool town, were named in the Domesday Book in 1086. Many of them were Anglo-Saxon settlements. Some though had 9th and 10th century Viking place names. The Vikings and Anglo-Saxons seem to have co-existed peacefully, with some Anglo-Saxon and Viking placenames later being joined – such as Layton-with-Warbreck and Bispham-with-Norbreck. Layton was controlled by the Butlers, Barons of Warrington from the 12th century.

In medieval times Blackpool emerged as a few farmsteads on the coast within Layton-with-Warbreck, the name coming from "le pull", a stream that drained Marton Mere and Marton Moss into the sea close to what is now Manchester Square. The stream ran through peatlands that discoloured the water, so the name for the area became "Black Poole". In the 15th century the area was just called Pul, and a 1532 map calls the area "the pole howsys alias the north howsys".

In 1602, entries in Bispham Parish Church baptismal register include both Poole and for the first time blackpoole. The first house of any substance, Foxhall, was built toward the end of the 17th century by Edward Tyldesley, the Squire of Myerscough and son of the Royalist Sir Thomas Tyldesley. An Act of Parliament in 1767 enclosed a common, mostly sand hills on the coast, that stretched from Spen Dyke southwards. Plots of the land were allocated to landowners in Bispham, Layton, Great Marton and Little Marton. The same act also provided for the layout of a number of long straight roads that would be built in the areas south of the town centre, such as Lytham Road, St. Annes Road, Watson Road and Highfield Road.

Taking the cure
By the middle of the 18th century, the practice of sea bathing to cure diseases was becoming fashionable among the wealthier classes, and visitors began making the arduous trek to Blackpool for that purpose. In 1781, Thomas Clifton and Sir Henry Hoghton built a private road to Blackpool, and a regular stagecoach service from Manchester and Halifax was established. A few amenities, including four hotels, an archery stall and bowling greens, were developed, and the town grew slowly. The 1801 census records the town's population at 473. The growth was accelerated by the actions of Henry Banks, often considered to be the "Father of Blackpool". In 1819 he purchased the Lane Ends estate, including the Lane Ends Hotel, and built the first holiday cottages. In 1837, his son-in-law Dr. John Cocker built Blackpool's first assembly rooms which still stand on the corner of Victoria Street and Bank Hey Street.

Arrival of the railways

The most significant event in the early growth of the town occurred in 1846, with the completion of a branch line to Blackpool from Poulton on the main Preston and Wyre Joint Railway line from Preston to Fleetwood. Fleetwood declined as a resort, as its founder and principal financial backer, Peter Hesketh-Fleetwood, went bankrupt. In contrast, Blackpool boomed. A sudden influx of visitors, arriving by rail, provided the motivation for entrepreneurs to build accommodation and create new attractions, leading to more visitors and a rapid cycle of growth throughout the 1850s and 1860s. In 1851 a Board of Health was formed. Gas lighting was introduced in 1852, and piped water in 1864. By 1851, the town's population was over 2,500.

The growth was intensified by the practice among the Lancashire cotton mill owners of closing the factories for a week every year to service and repair machinery. These became known as wakes weeks. Each town's mills would close for a different week, allowing Blackpool to manage a steady and reliable stream of visitors over a prolonged period in the summer.

In 1863, the North Pier was completed, rapidly becoming a centre of attraction for elite visitors. Central Pier was completed in 1868, with a theatre and a large open-air dance floor. The town expanded southward beyond what is today known as the Golden Mile, towards South Shore, and South Pier was completed in 1893, making Blackpool the only town in the United Kingdom with three piers. In 1878, the Winter Gardens complex opened, incorporating ten years later the Opera House, said to be the largest in Britain outside London.

The town was granted a Charter of Incorporation as a municipal borough in 1876. W.H. Cocker, son of Dr John Cocker, and therefore grandson of Henry Banks, was its first mayor. The town would become a county borough in 1904.

From the 1880s until the First World War, Blackpool was one of the regular destinations for the Bass Excursions, when trains would take employees of Bass's Burton brewery on an annual trip to the seaside.

Electricity

Much of Blackpool's growth and character from the 1870s on was predicated on the town's pioneering use of electrical power. In 1879, it became the first municipality in the world to have electric street lighting, as large parts of the promenade were wired. The lighting and its accompanying pageants reinforced Blackpool's status as the North of England's most prominent holiday resort, and its specifically working-class character. It was the forerunner of the present-day Blackpool Illuminations. In 1885 one of the world's first electric tramways was laid down as a conduit line running from Cocker Street to Dean Street on the Promenade. The line was operated by the Blackpool Electric Tramway Company until 1892 when their lease expired and Blackpool Corporation took over running the line. A further line was added in 1895 from Manchester Square along Lytham Road to South Shore, and the line was extended north, first to Gynn Square in 1899, and then to Fleetwood. In 1899 the conduit system was replaced by overhead wires. The tramway has remained in continuous service to this day.

By the 1890s, the town had a population of 35,000 and could accommodate 250,000 holidaymakers. The number of annual visitors, many staying for a week, was estimated at three million. 1894 saw the opening of two of the town's most prominent buildings: the Grand Theatre on Church Street and Blackpool Tower on the Promenade. The Grand Theatre was one of Britain's first all-electric theatres.

The first decade of the new century saw the development of the Promenade as we know it today and further development southwards beyond South Shore towards Harrowside and Squires Gate. The Pleasure Beach was first established about this time. Seasonal static illuminations were first set up in 1912, although due to World War I and its aftermath they only enjoyed two seasons until they were re-introduced in 1925. The illuminations extended the holiday season into September and early October, ceremonially switched on by notables and celebrities.

Towards the present

The inter-war period saw Blackpool attain pre-eminence as a holiday destination. By 1920, Blackpool claimed around eight million visitors per year, three times as many as its nearest British rivals, still drawn largely from the mill towns of East Lancashire and the West Riding of Yorkshire. Stanley Park was laid out in 1920 and opened in 1926. The area around the park has become renowned for some of the most desirable residences in the area.

In 1937, Littlewoods opened its first department store in the town.

Documents have been found to suggest that the reason Blackpool escaped heavy damage in World War II was that Adolf Hitler had earmarked the town to remain a place of leisure after his planned invasion. Despite this, on 11 September 1940, German bombs fell near Blackpool North railway station and eight people were killed in nearby houses in Seed Street. This site today is occupied by the new Town Hall offices and Sainsbury's Supermarket.

In the same war, the Free Polish Air Force made its headquarters in exile at Blackpool in Talbot Square, after the force evacuated to Britain from France. The nearby Layton Cemetery contains the war graves of 26 Polish airmen. The famous No. 303 Polish Fighter Squadron was formed in Blackpool, and became the most successful Fighter Command unit shooting down 126 German machines in only 42 days during the Battle of Britain.

Blackpool's population boom was complete by 1951, by which time some 147,000 people were living in the town – compared to 47,000 in 1901 and a mere 14,000 in 1881. In the decade after the war, the town continued to attract more visitors, reaching a zenith of 17 million per year. However, several factors combined to make this growth untenable. The decline of the textile industry led to a de-emphasis of the traditional week-long break, known as wakes week. The rise of package holidays took many of Blackpool's traditional visitors abroad where the weather was more reliably warm and dry and improved road communications, epitomised by the construction of the M55 motorway in 1975, made Blackpool more feasible as a day trip rather than an overnight stay. The economy, however, remains relatively undiversified, and firmly rooted in the tourism sector.

Government

Though the Blackpool Urban Area extends beyond the statutory boundaries of Blackpool to encompass Fleetwood, Cleveleys, Thornton, Poulton-le-Fylde and Lytham St Annes, Blackpool remains administratively separate with its wider borough.

Between 1904 and 1974, Blackpool formed a county borough independent of the administrative county of Lancashire. With the passage of the Local Government Act 1972, Blackpool's county borough status was abolished and it was made part of the shire county of Lancashire. On 1 April 1998, however, Blackpool was made a unitary authority and re-formed as an autonomous local government. However, it remains part of Lancashire for ceremonial purposes.

As of the 2019 election Blackpool Council is currently controlled by the Labour Party, who took control from the Conservatives in 2011. They are the largest party represented with 23 councillors followed by the Conservative Party with 15 councillors.

Blackpool is covered by two Westminster constituencies: 
 Blackpool North and Cleveleys, 
 Blackpool South.

Demographics
The population of Blackpool has been declining constantly since 2001 and is expected to decline even further in the future.

In the 2011 census Blackpool was stated to have the highest percentage of divorced people in the country, 13.1% compared to the average of 9% for England and Wales.

Population change

Public health 
In 2017, Blackpool had the fourth highest rate of antidepressant prescription in England with the most common health problems being depression, stress and anxiety. At 12.9%, Blackpool had the highest fraction of working-age people too sick to work and has no improvement on this percentage since 1999 despite the rate in the North West England as a whole improving from 11% in 1999 to 7.8% in 2016. Blackpool also has high rates of obesity (13.5%), smoking (27%) and alcoholic liver disease (28 deaths per 100 thousand).  Men in the Bloomfield ward had the lowest life expectancy at birth, 68.2 years, of any ward in England and Wales in 2016.

Economy
This is a chart of the trend of regional gross value added (GVA) of Blackpool at current basic prices by the Office for National Statistics with figures in millions of British Pounds Sterling.

While Blackpool hosts a large number of small businesses and self-employed people, there are some large employers. The government-owned National Savings and Investments was based at Marton, together with their Hardware random number generator, ERNIE ( "Electronic Random Number Indicator Equipment"), which picked the Premium Bond numbers until their demolition in 2017. Other government agencies are based at Warbreck and Norcross further up the Fylde coast. Burton's Biscuit Company, Tangerine Confectionery produce biscuits and other confectionery products, Klarius UK manufactures automotive components, Victrex manufactures high-performance polymers and the Glasdon Group is a plastics manufacturer making litter bins, park benches and reflective road signs.

TVR formerly produced sports cars at its Bispham factory. Blackpool was also the original site of Swallow Sidecar Company, forerunner of Jaguar Cars.

The 2015 HSBC research on rental yields ranks Blackpool in the top three cities with the best rental returns. The numerous urban regeneration projects, the property prices which are among the most affordable in the UK, and the high rental yields create a very favourable environment for real estate investors.

Blackpool's main shopping streets are Church Street, Victoria Street, Birley Street, Market Street, Corporation Street, Bank Hey Street, Abingdon Street and Talbot Road. There is currently one shopping centre within the town, Houndshill Shopping Centre.

Geography

Physical 
Blackpool rests in the middle of the western edge of The Fylde, which is a coastal plain atop a peninsula. The majority of the town district is built up, with very little semi-rural space such as at Marton Mere. Due to the low-lying terrain, Blackpool experiences occasional flooding, with a large-scale project completed in 2017 to rebuild the seawall and promenade to mitigate this.

Climate

Blackpool has, like all of the UK, a temperate maritime climate according to the Köppen climate classification system. Thus the same cool summer, frequent overcast skies and small annual temperature range is typical.

The lowest temperature to occur in recent years is  during December 2010. In a more normal winter, the coldest night averages .

The absolute maximum temperature recorded in Blackpool was  during July 1976. The highest temperature to occur in recent years is  during July 2015.

Green belt 

Blackpool is within a green belt region that extends into the wider surrounding counties and is in place to reduce urban sprawl, prevent the towns in the Blackpool urban area and other nearby conurbations in Lancashire from further convergence, protect the identity of outlying communities, encourage brownfield reuse, and preserve nearby countryside. This is achieved by restricting inappropriate development within the designated areas, and imposing stricter conditions on the permitted building.

As the town's urban area is highly built up, only  (2017) of green belt exists within the borough, covering the cemetery, its grounds and nearby academy/college playing fields by Carleton, as well as the football grounds near the airport by St Annes. Further afield, portions are dispersed around the wider Blackpool urban area into the surrounding Lancashire districts of Fylde and Wyre, helping to keep the settlements of Lytham St Annes, Poulton-le-Fylde, Warton/Freckleton and Kirkham separated.

Tourism

Blackpool is heavily dependent on tourism. In what is often regarded as its heyday (1900–1950), Blackpool thrived as the factory workers of Northern England took their annual holidays there en masse, known as wakes weeks. Photographs from that era show crowds of tourists on the beach and promenade. Blackpool was also a preferred destination of visitors from Glasgow and remains so to this day. The town went into decline when affordable air travel arrived in the 1960s and the many previous visitors instead travelled to Mediterranean coastal resorts due to competitive prices and the more reliable weather. Today Blackpool remains the most popular seaside resort in the UK; however, the town has suffered a serious drop in numbers of visitors which have fallen from 17 million in 1992 to 10 million today.
Similarly Pleasure Beach Blackpool was the country's most popular free attraction with 6 million visitors a year but has lost over a million visitors since 1998 and has recently introduced a £6 entrance fee.

In July 2010, an independent survey of 4,500 members of the general public by consumer magazine Which? Holiday (now Which? Travel) found that Blackpool was the UK's favourite seaside resort, followed by Brighton, Whitby, Bournemouth and Scarborough. Blackpool has now improved the seawall and promenade, and Blackpool Tower has been revamped.

In February 2012, a number of tourist attractions in Blackpool collaborated to produce the Blackpool Resort Pass which allows for discounted access in one ticket. The original pass included visits to Merlin Entertainments attractions and Blackpool Pleasure Beach. In February 2013, Marketing Blackpool, formerly the Tourism division of Blackpool Council, led the relaunch of the Blackpool Resort Pass which includes additional attractions including Blackpool Zoo, Sandcastle Waterpark and Blackpool Model Village and Gardens.

Blackpool has a pioneering publicly owned Municipal wireless network Wi-Fi, which covers the entire town centre, promenade and beach front. Visitors can take a virtual tour of Blackpool, and full internet access is available.

Conferences

Outside the main holiday season, Blackpool's Winter Gardens routinely used to host major political and trade union conferences. However, in recent years these are increasingly taking place in major cities with modern, purpose-built conference centres.

The National Union of Students last held its Annual Conference in Blackpool in 2009; they will now be hosted by the Sage Gateshead. In January 2011, Blackpool hosted the NEEC Conference (formerly the North of England Education Conference), a key date in the education calendar. The Winter Gardens also hold the National Pensioners' Parliament.

The Young Farmers convention has been held regularly in Blackpool since the late 1960s.

Entertainment
Blackpool remains a summer entertainment venue but many local establishments now trade all year round. It is known for specialising in variety shows featuring entertainers catering to a broad range of tastes, from family-friendly Ken Dodd to the 'adults only' humour of Roy 'Chubby' Brown.

In recent years artists such as DJ Jazzy Jeff & The Fresh Prince, Britney Spears and Pitbull, have performed in Blackpool and have performed during the MTV Illuminations switch-on weekends.

In 2018 The Blackpool festival took place on the comedy carpet in front of the Blackpool Tower which over three days played host to world class DJs and entertainers.

For the following four Fridays after the illuminations switch-on the town plays host to the world fireworks championship where four teams from around the world design their displays in time with music and are judged on their technique and display. On the fifth Friday following the illuminations switch-on the competition winner is announced and performs another display. These displays often attract thousands of visitors to the promenade.

Regular shows include those from Viva cabaret bar, the legends shows, Funny Girls, Joey Blower, Joe Longthorn as well as regular performances at both the Winter Gardens and Grand Theatre. The town has also seen a number of new food outlets opening. The Tower Ballroom still opens daily for dancing and hosts international dance competitions as well as playing host to many episodes of Strictly Come Dancing.

The Grand Theatre (locally known as 'The Grand') was designed by Victorian theatre architect Frank Matcham and was opened in 1894 after a construction period of seven months, at a cost of £20,000 between December 1893 and July 1894. The project was conceived and financed by local theatre manager Thomas Sergenson who had been using the site of the Grand for several years to stage a circus. He had also transformed the fortunes of other local theatres.

Matcham's brief was to build Sergenson the "prettiest theatre in the land". The Grand was Matcham's first theatre to use an innovative 'cantilever' design to support the tiers, thereby reducing the need for the usual pillars and so allowing clear views of the stage from all parts of the auditorium.

The town also plays host to the longest-running seaside show in Britain, Legends, which features multiple tribute artists with a live band and dance troupe, first appearing at the North Pier in 1999, then at the Central Pier from 2000 to 2012 and now at the Sands Venue. Current tribute artists include "Neil Diamond", "Adele", "Elton John" and "Robbie Williams".

In February 2018 council chiefs attended a convention in Florida to identify a new "concert venue" concept for the town, doubling as a new purpose-built centre for conferences and conventions. The site earmarked for the propose project is the old central station site which now serves as a car park and police station with law courts on Bonny Street. The police have since moved to a brand new facility near to the M55 motorway entrance and the site in central Blackpool is earmarked for the new potential development.

An Imax cinema has been announced by the council as adding on to the existing Hounds Hill shopping centre on land that is now a ground level car park. The development is to be shared with the Wilko store which is to re-locate from its current location to make way for a new hotel and transport hub as part of the current urban regeneration and infrastructure improvements in the town. Expected final completion for these projects has still not been announced although work has begun on some of the foundation works.

Events and festivals

Gay Blackpool
Blackpool had its first gay pride celebration in 2006. Historically, seaside resorts have been able to provide niches for minority groups. Blackpool, like other English resorts, has had a reputation for being a safe community for gay people. During World War II, there was a proliferation of cafés, pubs and clubs where homosexual men could meet in Blackpool. In the 1990s, the town began to be promoted as a gay tourist destination. Blackpool contains several bars, pubs and nightclubs aimed at the LGBT community. These include Funny Girls (a burlesque cabaret showbar), Buzz, Flamingo, and the Flying Handbag.

Pollution
Pollution was often found in the seawater at Blackpool, in particular bacteria counts that frequently exceeded the standards of the Environment Agency. However, sea water quality improved significantly since unfavourable reports in 2013, with the resort's south beach winning a Blue Flag award in 2016, and three other beaches achieving Seaside Award Status.

Regeneration

Blackpool has taken steps to improve its tourism industry. One controversial proposal, which had the involvement of the local council, was to transform Blackpool into a casino resort along the lines of the Las Vegas Strip and Atlantic City, making it the centre point of gambling in the UK. Ultimately, Manchester was selected for the initial trial by the Government's Casinos Advisory Panel. Since this decision, Blackpool's council and MPs have lobbied Parliament extensively, claiming their bid was misunderstood. The local newspaper, the Blackpool Gazette, sent a petition signed by over 11,500 local residents and visitors demanding the decision be reconsidered. On 29 March 2007, the Advisory Panel's recommendations were approved by the House of Commons, but rejected by the House of Lords, meaning the bill would be reconsidered by parliament. However, in early 2008 the House of Lords voted against the super-casino proposal, and the Government proceeded no further with the idea. In 2019, plans to develop a casino with other visitor attractions on the central car park (Blackpool Central Station) site were announced.

The Talbot Gateway is a planned civic quarter, originally costed at £285m in 2003.  work was continuing on what is reported to be a "billion-pound growth and prosperity programme".

Regeneration work was completed in July 2009 on Waterloo Road in South Shore that transformed the area into a modern shopping centre. £1 million of public investment is helping to improve the public realm and act as a catalyst for the regeneration of South Shore.

In March 2010 it was confirmed that a deal had been made for Blackpool Council to purchase some of Blackpool's most notable landmarks from private ownership. The deal, totalling £38.9m, had national and local government backing and included the purchase of:

Blackpool Tower
The Winter Gardens
The Sea Life Centre
Louis Tussauds Wax Works
The Blackpool Tower Dungeon
Indoor Golf Centre
Bonny Street Market
Mr T's Amusement Arcade

Merlin Entertainments Group also took over the running of Louis Tussauds Wax Works, converting it into their better-known brand, Madame Tussauds Wax Works. The Winter Gardens were purchased by Blackpool Council; the complex is operated by Crown Entertainment Centres Ltd.

Landmarks and places of interest

Major attractions

Other attractions

Theatres & Venues
 Grand Theatre, Blackpool was built by Frank Matcham in 1894. It offers a mix of drama, dance, opera, ballet and comedy including a yearly pantomime.
 The Winter Gardens is a large entertainment and conference venue in the town centre. It includes the Opera House (one of the largest theatres in Europe), Pavilion Theatre, Empress Ballroom, Spanish Hall, Arena and Olympia.
The Imperial Hotel is a large red-brick Victorian hotel, which has hosted guests such as Charles Dickens, Queen Elizabeth II and Margaret Thatcher.
 Blackpool Sands stretch along the whole seafront and comprise the main natural attraction for tourists.
 Funny Girls is a drag cabaret burlesque showbar, located on Dickson Road.
 Viva Cabaret Showbar & Events Suite is a Vegas-style production show venue next to the Tower.

Former attraction
The Doctor Who Exhibition, which closed in 2009, was the biggest Doctor Who exhibition in the UK, containing props and costumes from the long-running BBC TV series, including some from recently aired programmes.

Transport

Air
Blackpool Airport operated regular charter and scheduled flights throughout the UK and Europe. The airport is actually just over the borough boundary into Fylde Borough, although a proposal to reorganise Blackpool's borders would see the airport incorporated into Blackpool Borough. This airport, formerly known as Blackpool Squires Gate Airport, is one of the oldest in the UK having hosted public flying meetings in 1909 and 1910. After a gap, it was active from the 1930s to mid 2014 and from December 2014 to date. Airlines that served Blackpool, before its temporary closure in late 2014, included Jet2.com and Aer Arran. The airport was reopened to small aircraft after failing to find a buyer in December 2014.

The airport's most recent scheduled services to Belfast and the Isle of Man ceased when Citywing suspended operations in March 2017.

In 1927 the local council announced that an airfield would be built near Stanley Park, which would become Stanley Park Aerodrome offering flights to the Isle of Man for £1-16s–0d (£1.80). The airport opened in 1929 and was officially opened by Prime Minister Ramsay MacDonald in 1931. However, with the opening of Squires Gate Airport a decision was announced in 1936 by the Ministry of Transport to close the Stanley Park airfield. In fact, civil operations continued until the outbreak of war with scheduled services to the Isle of Man and elsewhere. During the war, Stanley Park was used as a Royal Air Force (RAF) training station, known as No. 3 School of Technical Training. Vickers assembled many Wellington bombers here and Bristol Beaufighters were repaired for the RAF. The airfield closed in 1947. The land on which the airport stood now covers Blackpool Zoo and a hotel and golf course. The hangars from the old airport are still in use at Blackpool Zoo as the main entrance building, Playbarn, Education Academy and camel house.

Bus and coach

 Blackpool Transport operates the main bus services in and around Blackpool
 Stagecoach Merseyside & South Lancashire operates the regional bus and coach services in and out of Blackpool
 National Express operates the main long-distance coach services in and out of Blackpool

Facilities include:
 Blackpool Talbot Road Bus Station, which was the main town centre bus station but is now a gym. Blackpool Transport stopped using the bus station in the early 2000s after a disagreement with Blackpool Council regarding the state of the bus station building. Blackpool Transport now use Market Street and Corporation Street, in the town centre, as their bus interchange. National Express have also recently stopped using this bus station, moving to the new National Express Blackpool Central Coach Station.
 Blackpool Central Coach Station, is main coach station for all National Express coach services. which is also used by some independent coach operators. The coach station has a booking office and toilet facilities.
 Blackpool Lonsdale Road Coach Station, was the main coach station for South Shore district of Blackpool. This was mainly used by independent coach operators. The coach station has a café, shop and toilet facilities but is in a state of disrepair.
 Blackpool Colosseum Bus & Coach Station, which was the main bus and coach station in South Shore. Located next to Blackpool Transport Headquarters, it was demolished to make way for a Somerfield supermarket.  The site is now occupied by the link road from the M55 motorway and additional depot parking.

Railway

Train operators that serve Blackpool are:
 Avanti West Coast
 Northern Trains

Stations in the town are, or were:
 Blackpool North (originally Talbot Road)
 Blackpool Pleasure Beach (originally Burlington Road Halt)
 Blackpool South (originally Waterloo Road)
 Layton (originally Bispham)
 Squires Gate (just outside the borough boundary but serving Blackpool Airport)
 Blackpool Central (originally Hounds Hill, closed 1964)
  (renamed Lytham Road 1903, closed 1916)

Blackpool once had two railway terminals with a total of over 30 platforms, mainly used by excursion traffic in the summer. Blackpool Central, close to Blackpool Tower, was closed in 1964, while Blackpool North was largely demolished and rebuilt as a smaller facility. The route of the former excursion line into Blackpool Central is now used as a link road from the M55 motorway to the town centre. The line into Blackpool via Lytham St Annes now has a station serving Blackpool Pleasure Beach but terminates at Blackpool South station. The line into North station is now the more important.

Road
The M55 motorway links the town to the national motorway network. Other major roads in the town are the A583 to Kirkham and Preston, the A587 and A585 to Fleetwood, the A586 to Poulton-le-Fylde, Garstang and Lancaster and the A584 and B5261 which both lead to Lytham St Annes.

Tram

The Blackpool Tramway runs from Starr Gate in Blackpool to Fleetwood and is the only surviving first-generation tramway in the United Kingdom. The tramway dates back to 1885 and is one of the oldest electric tramways in the world. It is run by Blackpool Transport, owned by Blackpool Council.

The tramway was for a long time the only working tramway in the United Kingdom outside of museums. It was also the UK's first electric system. However, there are now a number of other tramways, including Manchester Metrolink, Sheffield Supertram and West Midlands Metro.

On 1 February 2008 it was announced that the Government had agreed to a joint Blackpool Transport and Blackpool Council bid for funding toward the total upgrade of the track. The government contributed £60.3m of the total £85.3m cost. Blackpool Council and Lancashire County Council each provided about £12.5m. The Government's decision meant that the entire length of the tramway from Starr Gate to Fleetwood was upgraded and also sixteen new trams joined the fleet.

In April 2012, the tramway reopened after the major reconstruction. Day to day services are run by the 16 Flexity 2 trams. Several double deck English Electric Balloon trams from the older fleet have been widened to work alongside the new trams to provide additional capacity in the summer months. Several non-modified older trams also operate a heritage service from Pleasure Beach to Little Bispham on weekends and holidays.

An extension of the new service to Blackpool North railway station was planned to open by April 2019 between the existing North Pier stop of the Blackpool Tramway, along Talbot Road, and terminating at Blackpool North railway station, but was delayed and is now on schedule to open Summer 2022.

Filmography

The resort is featured in the 1934 film Sing as We Go, starring Gracie Fields, as well as other cinema and TV productions, including Forbidden (1949), Hindle Wakes (1952), Holiday (1957), Coasting (1990), Funny Bones (1995) starring Lee Evans and Oliver Platt and directed by St. Annes born Peter Chelsom, and The Parole Officer (2001) starring Steve Coogan.

The Japanese film Shall We Dance? (1996) closes with a scene at the World Ballroom Dancing Championships in Blackpool. All the hair styling for the film was completed by Blackpool-born-and-bred hairstylist Eileen Clough, who has been in the trade since the 1960s. In the Hollywood remake of the film (2004), directed by Peter Chelsom, Blackpool is mentioned but not shown.

Blackpool is the setting for Bhaji on the Beach (1993) directed by Gurinder Chadha. The film Like It Is (1998) directed by Paul Oremland was also partly filmed in Blackpool. The opening scenes were filmed in the Flamingo. The 2005 television comedy/thriller series Funland revolved around the fictionalised, seedier aspects of Blackpool.

The town also features heavily in the BBC television serial Blackpool, starring David Morrissey, Sarah Parish and David Tennant and first broadcast in 2004, and the one-off follow-up Viva Blackpool, broadcast in June 2006.

In 2006 Lion Television filmed The Great British Summer, which featured many buildings in Blackpool. The Royal Windsor Hotel was featured, with the owner talking all about the hotel seasons and industry. Bernard Manning was also shown at the hotel doing his spot through the season hosted by Blackpool Born local Entertainer & DJ Gordon Head and other local acts. The Great British Summer was narrated by Alan Titchmarsh.

Between 10 September 2012 and 19 November 2012 the resort was featured in Channel 4's 999: What's Your Emergency?.

The resort was also featured in the three-part reality television series, Blackpool Lights on Channel 5 in December 2013.

As well as this, the 2016 Tim Burton film Miss Peregrine's Home for Peculiar Children also features Blackpool and its key tourist attraction, The Blackpool Tower.

Blackpool was once again featured in a Channel 5 documentary series from 26 October 2017, this time entitled Bargain Loving Brits in Blackpool. The series ran for six episodes until 30 November 2017.

Culture

Music 
Reginald Dixon, MBE, ARCM, who held the position as organist at the Tower Ballroom, Blackpool from March 1930 until March 1970 made and sold more recordings than any other organist.

Blackpool Symphony Orchestra was founded by Percy Dayman in 1921. It presents an annual series of concerts and organises educational and community outreach projects.

1950s
Frank Sinatra performed at the Opera House on several occasions in the 1950s. A 1953 concert was recorded and eventually released on CD many years later.

1960s
The Beatles had a long and varied association with Blackpool, including a significant event in John Lennon's early childhood and multiple gigs in the town between 1963 and 1965.

Formed in Blackpool in 1963, The Rockin' Vickers were a rock and roll beat combo most notable for featuring Ian "Lemmy" Kilmister, then known as Ian Frasier, later of Hawkwind and more famously Motörhead, as a bassist and vocalist. The band recorded four singles before splitting in 1967. The other Rockin' Vickers guitarist, Nick Gribbon, continues to perform in pubs in and around Blackpool as Nick Unlimited, with an open door policy that has given many talented younger Blackpool musicians their first opportunity to play live.

The Executives were a Blackpool band who recorded a handful of singles in the 1960s including the original 1964 version of March of the Mods, which became a top 40 hit for Joe Loss and His Orchestra in the same year. The tune was written by Tony Carr, the father of Executives' frontman Roy Carr, who later became a well-known music journalist with New Musical Express and the author of several books on popular music and executive editor of music magazines including New Musical Express, Melody Maker and Vox. Executives bass player Glenn Cornick became a founding member of Jethro Tull, later forming Wild Turkey. Tony Williams, The Executives' guitarist, joined Stealers Wheel soon after its formation in 1972 and also briefly joined Jethro Tull in 1978 as a touring bassist.

Additionally, the nascent Jethro Tull, then called The Blades, featuring future Tull members Ian Anderson, John Evan, Jeffrey Hammond, and Barrie Barlow, formed as students in Blackpool in the early 1960s.

Blackpool was notorious for having imposed an indefinite ban on the Rolling Stones from performing in the town in 1964 after a riot broke out among the audience who had found their performance "suggestive" during their concert at the Empress Ballroom. The ban was lifted forty-four years later in March 2008.

The Jimi Hendrix – Experience video and DVD features concert footage of Hendrix's performance at Blackpool's Opera House in 1967.

1970s
Psychedelic rock band Complex were formed in Blackpool in 1968 and self-released two albums in 1971. Only 99 copies of their self-titled debut were pressed and this extremely rare vinyl album has since been described as "one of the "Holy Trinity" items of rare British Psychedelia". The band continued to play until 1978 when they disbanded with the onset of punk. Limited edition remastered versions of both Complex albums were released by Guersson in 2012.

A number of bands from Blackpool achieved a level of success during the punk and post-punk era. Factory Records' Section 25 were formed in 1977 in Poulton-le-Fylde, a small market town on the outskirts of Blackpool, as were the 1976–79 version of punk band Skrewdriver, who recorded several singles and an album for the Chiswick label (the skinhead "white power" rock act of the same name that gained notoriety later, contained only one member of the original band). Both bands claimed Blackpool as their place of origin.

1980s and 1990s
Another Blackpool band signed to Factory was Tunnelvision, who recorded just one single for the label in 1981.

When Barry Lights relocated his Lightbeat record label from Leeds to Blackpool in 1981, the label's first Blackpool signing was electronic rock band Zoo Boutique. After releasing the debut single by Fleetwood punk band One Way System, Lights set up specialist hardcore punk Beat the System label. Blackpool punk band The Fits were amongst the first to benefit, eventually releasing four indie chart hit singles in 1982–85.

The Membranes who featured John Robb initially set up their own Vinyl Drip record label in 1981 before achieving three indie top 20 hits from 1984 to 1986, reaching number 6 in John Peel's Festive Fifty in 1984 and making a pre-recorded appearance on Channel 4 rock show The Tube.

The Ceramic Hobs formed in 1985 and to date have "made more than 30 uncategorisable releases on vinyl, CD and cassette for many different worldwide record labels".

Blackpool musician Lucifer's "Cyber Punk Rock" EPs of 1994 contained the first full vocal songs intended for playback on a computer.

2000 onwards
21st century musical exports from Blackpool include Karima Francis, The Locals, who first appeared on BBC Introducing when they were just 15, Goonies Never Say Die, Litterbug, Aiden Grimshaw who came ninth on the 2010 series of X Factor, The Senton Bombs, UFX/Uncle Fester and Little Boots, who topped the BBC Sound of... poll in 2009.

The White Stripes recorded their first official DVD, Under Blackpool Lights, at the Empress Ballroom in the Winter Gardens on 27 and 28 January 2004. Get Up Kids guitarist Jim Suptic's Kansas City, Missouri, indie rock band Blackpool Lights is named after the DVD title.

In 2005, a compilation album, The Ugly Truth About Blackpool Volume One, chronologically documenting the best of Blackpool indie rock music from 1977 to 2005, was released by Andy Higgins' JSNTGM Records in conjunction with the Arts Council, Blackpool Evening Gazette and Blackpool Council. Volume 2, showcasing the best Blackpool indie bands active in 2005/6 was released the following year. Other Blackpool recording artists on JSNTGM include Sick 56, Erase Today and Litterbug.

Each August since 2006, Blackpool has been the venue for the largest festival of punk rock in the world, the annual Rebellion Festival, which is held in the Winter Gardens over four days and features over 200 punk bands.

In the 2010s, Grime music in Blackpool increased dramatically with the invention of BGMedia. They gained millions of views but also caught controversy due to the lyrical content of BGMedia rappers.

In August 2018, German Indie label Firestation Records released in Europe and Japan an eleven track retrospective album 'Illuminated', on Vinyl and CD, by the late 1980s Blackpool Indie Band 'Rik Rak'.

Songs about Blackpool

In 1937 George Formby's song "With My Little Stick of Blackpool Rock", was banned by BBC radio for having suggestive lyrics.

The Kinks' song "Autumn Almanac" contains the following lines: "... I go to Blackpool for my holidays/Sit in the open sunlight ..."

"She Sold Blackpool Rock" was a minor success in 1969 for Honeybus as the follow up to their 1968 top ten hit single "I Can't Let Maggie Go".

Graham Nash's semi-autobiographical song "Military Madness" begins "In an upstairs room in Blackpool / By the side of a northern sea / The army had my father / And my mother was having me".

Paul McCartney recorded a song entitled "Blackpool" amongst a number of demo home recordings in the years 1971 and 1972.

The Jethro Tull song "Up the 'Pool" from the 1972 Living in the Past album is about Blackpool, singer Ian Anderson and other members of the band's childhood home. Another Tull track about the beach attractions of Blackpool is "Big Dipper", from the 1976 album Too Old to Rock 'n' Roll: Too Young to Die!.

In the early 1980s the then Blackpool-based band The Membranes used the town as the subject matter for their "Tatty Seaside Town" 1988 single, which was later covered by Therapy? in 1994.

Other songs written about Blackpool include Oh Blackpool by The Beautiful South and several different songs called "Blackpool", by Sham 69, Macc Lads, Roy Harper and The Delgados. "Blackpool" is also the title song from a production co-written with author Irvine Welsh and Vic Godard (Subway Sect) in 2002, later released as a four-song EP called Blackpool. A song called "Blackpool Fool" appears on the Frank Sidebottom album A, B, C & D (1997).

Franz Ferdinand's 2013 "Love Illumination" single was originally called "Blackpool Illuminati".

Songs that mention Blackpool in the lyrics include "Elvis Impersonator: Blackpool Pier", the opening track of the Manic Street Preachers album Everything Must Go, which contains the lyric "20ft high off Blackpool Promenade" amongst other references to Blackpool. The opening line of Soft Cell's 1982 "Say Hello, Wave Goodbye" hit (later a hit for David Gray in 1998) "Standing at the door of the Pink Flamingo, Crying in the rain" is believed to be a reference to Blackpool's famous gay nightclub The Flamingo. Låpsley's chillout song "Painter (Valentine)" includes the lines "you can paint these wings and make me fly / crush coming over like the R.E.M kind / orange in the colour like Blackpool on the sunrise".

Folk songs written about the town include The Houghton Weavers anthem "The Blackpool Belle" ("Oh the Blackpool Belle was a getaway train that went from Northern stations. What a beautiful sight on a Saturday night bound for the illuminations"), Jasper Carrot's "Day Trip To Blackpool" ("Didn't we have a miserable time the day we went to Blackpool? An 'orrible day, we got drunk on the way And spent our money on chips and bingo...") and Mike Harding's single "Talking Blackpool Blues" ("Well my Mam and Dad and Gran and me / We went to Blackpool by sea / It rained and rained for most of the day / But we all got tanned in a funny sort of way").

Notable musicians born in Blackpool

 John Evan, keyboard player with Jethro Tull (1969–1980), leader of The Blades, John Evan Band and John Evan Smash
 Jeffrey Hammond, bass guitarist with Jethro Tull, (1970–1975)
 Chris Lowe of Pet Shop Boys
 Nick McCarthy of Franz Ferdinand
 Larry Cassidy of Section 25
 Gary Miller (1924–1968), had a hit with The Yellow Rose of Texas
 Graham Nash of The Hollies / Crosby, Stills, Nash & Young
 Robert Smith of The Cure
 John Robb, singer and bass guitarist 
 Jon Gomm acoustic guitarist
 Maddy Prior, folk singer
 Rae Morris, singer-songwriter
 Victoria Hesketh, better known as her stage name Little Boots
 David Atherton, conductor and co-founder of the London Sinfonietta
 Boston Manor, alternative rock band

Media
Newspapers that cover the Blackpool area include the Blackpool Gazette, the daily newspaper covering the Fylde Coast area, known locally as The Gazette. They also publish a free weekly newspaper, the Blackpool Reporter, which is delivered to householders in Blackpool. The Gazette also publishes a daily online version in Polish, Witryna Polska (Polish Gazette) to cater for the local Polish community. The Lancashire Evening Post is a daily evening newspaper covering the county of Lancashire.

Blackpool has a pioneering publicly owned Municipal wireless network, Wi-Fi that covers the entire town centre, promenade and beach front. Full internet access is available via the publicly owned Municipal wireless network.

Local radio was provided by Radio Wave, a commercial radio station, based on Mowbray Drive in Blackpool, which covered the Fylde Coast area. This radio station closed and last aired on 20 August 2020. Blackpool also falls in the coverage area of BBC Radio Lancashire, Rock FM, Greatest Hits Radio Lancashire, Smooth North West and Heart North West.

Blackpool Gay Radio provides a part-time radio service catering for the local gay community featuring a mix of music, local features, news and celebrity interviews.

Blackpool also has four music related internet radio stations:

 Fylde FM, the Fylde Coast's largest internet radio station.
 Radio Vibe 2001 – 2003 (Blackpool Fylde & Wyre), an online music service only.
 Splash Net Radio
 Lancashire's Lighthouse Radio (Part of LLR Ministries)

Radio Victoria, based in Victoria Hospital, broadcasts throughout the hospital.

National television with local opt-outs is provided by ITV Granada, the ITV franchise holder for the North West, BBC North West, the regional BBC station for the North West region.

Blackpool also has a dedicated local TV news service, That's Lancashire, part of the That's TV network, broadcast from their studio in Preston.

Sport

Boxing
Blackpool has two main venues for boxing fight nights, the Tower Circus Arena and the Winter Gardens, which both hold regular fight nights throughout the year. Events at these venues have been screened on Sky Sports, British Eurosport and Channel M.

Blackpool is home to many current and former professional boxers including Brian Rose (born in Birmingham), Jack Arnfield, Jeff Thomas (born in Dordrecht), Mathew Ellis (born in Oldham), Matty Askin (born in Barnsley), RP Davies and Scott Cardle.

Cricket
Blackpool Cricket Club are Blackpool's major cricketing team; they won the League Cup in 2013 and were National Champions in 1990. They won the Lancashire Cup on eight occasions between 1973 and 1996 and were League Champions fourteen times. Their home is in the grounds of Stanley Park, which also hosts Lancashire County Cricket Club.

Football
The town's professional football club is Blackpool F.C., who have spent 31 seasons in the top division and won the 1953 FA Cup Final. There are other, smaller football clubs located within Blackpool, including A.F.C. Blackpool, Blackpool Wren Rovers and Squires Gate.

Golf
There are three golf clubs in Blackpool. Blackpool North Shore Golf Club opened in 1904, moving to its present site on Knowle Hill in 1927; the new course was designed by Harry Colt. In 1926, an Alister MacKenzie designed course opened within Stanley Park; it is home to Blackpool Park Golf Club. The newest addition is Herons' Reach Golf Resort, which was designed by Peter Allis and Clive Clark and opened in 1992. Blackpool Golf Club, which opened in 1894, was located in South Shore; it closed at the beginning of World War II, with the land subsequently becoming part of Blackpool Airport.

Rugby
Blackpool Borough were the first professional rugby league club in the town. However, they eventually folded after leaving the town in 1987. Blackpool Panthers were formed in 2004 and played in Co-operative Championship One. They ground-shared at Bloomfield Road then in 2007 at Woodlands Memorial Ground, the home of Fylde Rugby Club in the neighbouring town of Lytham St Annes. The club ceased to exist after the 2010 season due to lack of finance.

Blackpool Stanley, Blackpool Scorpions and Blackpool Sea Eagles are amateur rugby league clubs in the town.

The resort formerly held the now discontinued Northern Rail Cup Final at Bloomfield Road, a Rugby League knockout competition for all clubs outside of the Super League attracting many thousands of visitors.

Blackpool is currently home to the annual 'Summer Bash' rugby league tournament held at Bloomfield Road, where an entire round of Championship matches are played in the city to showcase the sport.

Blackpool also has a rugby union club, called Blackpool RUFC. Their home ground is Norbreck Rugby Ground.

Running
The annual Blackpool Marathon is staged on the Promenade each April. Thousands of competitors run on the closed Promenade, organised by Fylde Coast Runners.

Professional wrestling
The Pleasure Beach's Horseshoe Show Bar was home to professional wrestling events throughout the season, promoted by Bobby Baron. The bar shows were home to a "wrestling booth" where members of the public could challenge the wrestlers for cash prizes for each round they survived. These challenges would be taken by shooters, wrestlers skilled in the brutal submission holds of catch wrestling, which they could deploy to defend the prize money even against skilled amateur wrestlers. Booths such as these had been a foundation of the professional wrestling industry since the 19th century, and Baron's booth is reputed to have been the last of its kind in the world.

Numerous renowned professional wrestlers worked as carnival shooters at the booth, including future WWE star William Regal; his tag team partner Robbie Brookside; Shak Khan, who runs a catch wrestling school in the area;  Dave Duran (John Palin) and future women's champion Klondyke Kate. The booth ended with Baron's death in 1994, although other promoters have since held shows in the bar. Additionally, the Tower Circus was a frequent venue for wrestling shows. A photograph of noted wrestling villain Jack Pye in action at the circus was, for some time in the late 2000s, displayed by the entrance to the circus. The tradition was revived by ASW when they promoted a summer season at the venue in 2008, and a similar summer season in 2012 at the Winter Gardens.  The Tower Ballroom hosted one date of the six show live tour of the World of Sport Wrestling TV show in February 2019.

WWE held a tournament at the Empress Ballroom on 14 and 15 January 2017 to crown the inaugural WWE United Kingdom Champion. In attendance were Regal and Triple H, with the latter commenting to local journalists, "Blackpool has this reputation. It's easy to get to, a lot of people come here and when they come here they lose it and that's what we wanted. I almost feel like there wasn't really another choice." Tyler Bate won the inaugural tournament to become the first WWE United Kingdom Champion.

Several renowned wrestlers have invested in Blackpool. Kendo Nagasaki owns the Trades Hotel and KAOS Nightclub, Rex Strong (born Barry Shearman, 1942–2017) owned the Hadley Hotel, and Johnny Saint owned a block of holiday flats in the town. Shirley "Big Daddy" Crabtree worked as a lifeguard on Central Pier. He was reunited, on a 1979 edition of ITV's This Is Your Life, with a woman whose life he had saved in the course of his duties.

The Blackpool Combat Club, a heel faction in All Elite Wrestling led by Regal, was named in honour of Blackpool.

Religion

Blackpool has a number of Christian churches, including 18 Anglican and 10 Catholic churches. Other Christian groups in the town include Blackpool Baptist Tabernacle, Blackpool Christian Centre, Blackpool Community Church, Kings Christian Centre, Liberty Church, and New Life Community Church. The Shrine of Our Lady of Lourdes is now redundant and is being converted into a community centre by the Historic Chapels Trust.

There were previously two synagogues in Blackpool for its Jewish population, now down to one. The Blackpool Reform Jewish Congregation caters to the Reform population and is located on Raikes Parade with a synagogue hall and classroom facilities, a purpose-built sanctuary hall and an assembly room. Blackpool United Hebrew Congregation was an Orthodox synagogue located on Leamington Road with a synagogue hall and community centre. The synagogue closed in May 2012 due to a declining Orthodox population, with the final rabbi David Braunold having retired in 2011. As of January 2022, the building which formerly housed the synagogue was awaiting new use.

There is a residential Buddhist Centre in North Shore called Keajra Kadampa Buddhist Centre which is a member of the New Kadampa Tradition. There are also two mosques for the Muslim population: the purpose-built Blackpool Central Mosque & Islamic Community Centre is located on Revoe Street and provides prayer facilities while the Blackpool Islamic Community Centre (BICC) offers Islamic education.

Blackpool also has small communities of Bahaʼis, Hindus, Jains, Mormons, and Sikhs. The Blackpool Faith Forum was established in 2001 in conjunction with Blackpool Council to provide interfaith dialogue between the various faith groups in the town, to raise awareness of the various faiths in the town and to promote a multifaith community. It is linked to the Interfaith Network of UK. In February 2007 a youth forum was established, Blackpool Faith Forum for Youth (BIFFY).

Education

As well as 29 state primary schools and eight state secondary schools, there is also a range of activities for children and young people in the town. Some of these are delivered by Blackpool Young People Services (a part of Blackpool Council).

Shipwrecks

A number of shipwrecks have occurred on the coastline of Blackpool. The most recent occurrence was the grounding of the cruiser Coco Leoni in March 2008. Famously, in 1897, HMS Foudroyant, Nelson's flagship before HMS Victory, was grounded close to North Pier in a storm.

Crimes
Blackpool has experienced numerous high-profile crimes since the early 20th century. In 2012, Blackpool was identified as a "crime hotspot", and in 2016 was revealed as having the fourth-highest murder rate in the UK. Rates of violent crime, sexual assault and domestic violence exceed national averages.

In 1913, the "Brides in the Bath" serial killer George Joseph Smith drowned his second wife Alice in their rented room of a boarding house on Regent Road. He was due to be the beneficiary of a sizeable life insurance policy upon his wife's death.

In 1971, Supt Gerry Richardson, 38, was shot dead while chasing a gang of London thugs who had robbed a resort jewellers. The five-man group bungled the raid on Preston's Jewellers in the Strand. They arrived late and failed to check a back room where the shop manager had already raised a silent alarm connected to Blackpool Police Station. As the gang made their getaway they became involved in a high-speed chase through the streets of North Shore which ended with Supt Richardson's tragic murder at the hands of "Fat" Freddie Sewell. Supt Richardson was posthumously awarded the George Cross in 1972. Wounded Inspector Carl Walker also received the George Cross.

In 1972, Dr Ahmad Alami (the son of the Grand Mufti of Jerusalem) murdered three sleeping children at Blackpool Victoria Hospital. He also stabbed two nurses and other children sleeping on the ward. Alami was diagnosed with paranoid schizophrenia and judged unfit to stand trial. He was detained at Broadmoor high security hospital for several years before being released and deported back to his native Jordan.

In 1999, Stuart Michael Diamond was convicted of the brutal murder of a homeless 17-year-old heroin addict, Christopher Hartley. Diamond murdered Hartley and dismembered his body before 'dumping' the remains in a hotel 'swill bin'; Hartley's head was never recovered.

In 2007, the jury in the case of the alleged rape and murder of Blackpool schoolgirl Charlene Downes, 14, heard a police surveillance tape of Jordanian Iyad Albattikhi, 29, and Iranian Mohammed Reveshi, 50, allegedly detailing her stabbing, and her later alleged disposal in their "Funny Boyz" kebab shop's mincing machine by the prosecution. Albattikhi allegedly boasted that he had sold her remains in kebabs. Both men were acquitted of the alleged offence. John Bromley-Davenport, for the defence, said: "We have uncovered within the Blackpool Police force an astonishing catalogue of incompetence, failure to disclose, manipulation and lies, some of which were uttered on oath during the trial last year. If the jury at that trial had swallowed the lies and been duped by the manipulation then a grave miscarriage of justice would have occurred."

Notable people

Blackpool has been the birthplace and/or home to a number of notable people.

Twin towns/Sister cities
Blackpool is twinned with:
  Bottrop, Germany
  Sanya, China

Freedom of the Borough
The following people and military units have received the Freedom of the Borough of Blackpool.

Individuals
 William Henry Cocker: 19 June 1897.
 Joseph Heap: 19 November 1907.
 John Bickerstaffe: 6 February 1912.
 James Fish: 6 February 1912.
 James Ward: 16 November 1914.
 Robert Butcher Mather: 16 November 1914.
 John Grime: 3 November 1915.
 James Heyes: 3 November 1915.
 Rt Hon David Lloyd George: 6 August 1918.
 Brigadier General Thomas Edward Topping: 2 August 1922.
 Thomas Bickerstaffe: 4 August 1926.
 Sir Lindsay Parkinson: 4 August 1926.
 William Henry Broadhead : 4 August 1926.
 Henry Brown : 3 October 1928.
 Samuel Hill : 3 October 1928.
 John Collins : 3 October 1928.
 Thomas Fielding : 3 October 1928.
 Lord Derby : 1 August 1934.
 Lord Stamp: 23 March 1937.
 Sir Cuthbert Cartwright Grundy: 31 January 1938.
 Sir Winston Churchill: 4 September 1946.
 Field Marshal Lord Montgomery of Alamein: 21 July 1948.
 Eli Hey Howe: 3 March 1950.
 Tom Gallon Lumb: 3 March 1950.
 Thomas Fenton: 3 March 1950.
 Sir Harold R Grime : 3 March 1950.
 Rhodes William Marshall: 2 May 1973.
 Harold Grimbledeston: 2 May 1973.
 Ernest Alfred Machin: 2 May 1973.
 Joseph Shepherd Richardson: 2 May 1973.
 Leonard Broughton: 2 May 1973.
 Raymond Jacobs: 25 June 1984.
 Walter Uriah Robinson: 25 June 1984.
 Harold Leslie Hoyle: 25 June 1984.
 Percy Patrick Hall: 25 June 1984.
 Stan Mortensen: 29 November 1989.
 Doris Thompson: 9 April 2003.
 Jimmy Armfield: 9 April 2003.

Military units
 R (Blackpool) Battery 288 (2nd West Lancashire) Light Anti-Aircraft Regiment Royal Artillery, Territorial Army: 1961.
 HMS Penelope RN: 1990. 
 12th Regiment Royal Artillery: 2005.
 The Duke of Lancaster's Regiment: 2017.
 The Loyal North Lancashire Regiment.
 HMS Triumph RN: 2017.

See also
Blackpool High Tide Organ
Listed buildings in Blackpool

Notes

References

Bibliography

External links

Business in Blackpool

Blackpool Council
Blackpool Entertainment Venues History

 
Seaside resorts in Lancashire
Towns in Lancashire
Beaches of Lancashire
Populated coastal places in Lancashire